The Pynsent Baronetcy, of Erthfont in the County of Wiltshire, was a title in the Baronetage of England. It was created on 13 September 1687 for William Pynsent, subsequently Member of Parliament for Devizes. The second Baronet was member of parliament for Taunton. The title became extinct on his death in 1765.

Pynsent baronets, of Erthfont (1687)
Sir William Pynsent, 1st Baronet (1642–1719)
Sir William Pynsent, 2nd Baronet ( – 12 January 1765)

See also
 Pinsent baronets

References

Extinct baronetcies in the Baronetage of England
1687 establishments in England